The Jean Canfield Building is a Government of Canada office building located in Charlottetown, Prince Edward Island. It is named after Jean Canfield, the first woman elected to the Legislative Assembly of Prince Edward Island.

The Jean Canfield building is one of the most environmentally friendly buildings ever constructed by Public Works and Government Services Canada.

The structure is a modest 17,500 m2 rising 5 stories, and houses approximately 500 civil servants, most from Veterans Affairs Canada. The project was under the supervision of the Department of Public Works and Government Services and is striving for what is known as Gold LEED certification, taking into consideration that it was conceived as a national showcase for sustainable and green design. It has a 108 kW solar panel on the roof, which in 2007 was the largest grid tied solar array in Canada.

References

External links
 Jean Canfield Government of Canada Building - description and pictures at HOK Design (copy archived October 17, 2012)
 Government of Canada Jean Canfield Building - description at Pomerleau Contracting (copy archived December 10, 2014)

Canadian federal government buildings
Buildings and structures in Charlottetown
HOK (firm) buildings